Love Is Gonna Get You is the 2007 release from Ben E. King.  This album is identical to the album Soul Masters, but has a different track order.

Track listing

"Travelin' Woman" – 3:35
"Love Is" – 3:00
"Poison In My Wine" – 3:03
"Love Is Gonna Get You" – 3:23
"Only You And I Know" – 3:22
"She Does It Right" – 4:02
"All of Your Tomorrows" – 4:56
"I Guess It's Goodbye" – 3:37
"Into the Mystic" – 3:50
"Take Me To The Pilot" – 3:42
"The Beginning Of It All" – 3:24
"White Moon" – 2:38

Ben E. King albums
2007 albums